Kaladzhukh is a rural locality (a selo) in Dokuzparinsky District, Republic of Dagestan, Russia. The population was 1,758 as of 2010. There are 6 streets.

Geography 
Kaladzhukh is located 9 km south of Usukhchay (the district's administrative centre) by road. Mikrakh and Kiler are the nearest rural localities.

Nationalities 
Lezgins live there.

References 

Rural localities in Dokuzparinsky District